Barry Barnet (born June 13, 1961) is a Canadian politician. He represented the electoral districts of Sackville-Beaver Bank and Hammonds Plains-Upper Sackville in the Nova Scotia House of Assembly from 1999 to 2009. He was a member of the Progressive Conservative Party of Nova Scotia.

Barnet was elected a municipal councillor for Halifax County, Nova Scotia in 1993, and served on Halifax Regional Council following the formation of the Halifax Regional Municipality in 1996. He entered provincial politics in the 1999 election, defeating New Democrat incumbent Rosemary Godin in the Sackville-Beaver Bank riding. He was re-elected in the 2003 election. In August 2003, Barnet was appointed to the Executive Council of Nova Scotia as Minister of African Nova Scotian Affairs, and Minister of Service Nova Scotia and Municipal Relations.

When Rodney MacDonald took over as premier in February 2006, Barnet remained Minister of African Nova Scotian Affairs, but was moved to Minister of Health Promotion and Protection, and Minister of Communications Nova Scotia. Barnet was re-elected in the 2006 election, and was given a new role in cabinet as Minister of Volunteerism, while retaining the positions he held prior to the election. In January 2009, Barnet was named Minister of Energy and Minister responsible for Conserve Nova Scotia, while continuing to serve as Minister of African Nova Scotian Affairs. Barnet was defeated by New Democrat Mat Whynott when he ran for re-election in 2009.

In January 2010, Barnet became the Executive Director of the All Terrain Vehicle Association of Nova Scotia.

Electoral record

2009 general election

2006 general election

2003 general election

1999 general election

References

1961 births
Canadian real estate agents
Halifax Regional Municipality councillors
Living people
Members of the Executive Council of Nova Scotia
People from Halifax, Nova Scotia
People from Sackville, Nova Scotia
Progressive Conservative Association of Nova Scotia MLAs
21st-century Canadian politicians